Lignières is a commune in the Cher department in the Centre-Val de Loire region of France.

Geography
The commune borders the department of Indre.

Population

Sights 

 The church of Notre-Dame, dating from the twelfth century.
 The chateau, originally a feudal castle, rebuilt in the seventeenth century.
 The chateau du Plessis.
 A manorhouse.
 A watermill.
 The sixteenth-century market hall.

Personalities
 Singer Florent Marchet was born here on 21 June 1975.
 Claimant to the Spanish throne, Prince Sixtus Henry of Bourbon-Parma, lives in the chateau.

International relations
Lignières is twinned with:
 Dunbar, in Scotland, UK.

See also
Communes of the Cher department

References

Communes of Cher (department)
Berry, France